The vice presidents of Honduras, also known as presidential designates, officially the designates to the presidency is the second highest political position in Honduras. According to the current constitution, the president and vice-presidents are elected in the same ticket. From 1957 to 2006 and from 2010 onwards there are positions of first, second, and third vice-president commonly known as designados presidenciales, literally "presidential designates".

Only during the Zelaya administration the vice-presidential position was held by one person, since the Congress reformed the Constitution in 2008 for that the vice-presidential charge would be held again by three persons. The position of vice president commissioner was created by former President Manuel Zelaya after Vice President Elvin Santos resigned in late 2008.

Functions and duties 
The duty of the vice presidents involve performing the functions of the president in their absence, usually due to incapacitation (one of the vice presidents is selected by the president to serve in the role on an temporary basis until the president's return). If the absence is considered to be permanent, then one of the three vicepresidents, selected by the National Congress, will fulfill the functions of the president until the end of the term. If all the vicepresidents are absent, the president of the National Congress takes over as acting president, and if the president of the National Congress is also absent then the president of the Supreme Court will become acting president until the end of the term.

Vice presidents are eligible to be impeached by the National Congress for poor performance or misconduct. Vice presidents are also not allowed to remain outside the country for more than 15 days without the permission of the National Congress.

Requirements and restrictions 
The requirements to be a vice president are the same as that of the president. A candidate must be Honduran by birth, be over the age of 30, have full civic rights, and may not be an active member of the leadership of any established religion.

Vice presidents may not be elected president while serving in the role, or within six months after the end of their term or resignation. Vice presidents can also not be elected as a deputy of the National Congress while serving in office.

History 
The following is a history of officeholders:

1839–1954

1957–1972 (Military Era)

Constitutional vice presidents (since 1982)

Presidential designates (1982–2006)

Vice-president and presidential commissioner (2006–2010) 
Before the 2005 elections, the Honduran Congress reformed the Constitution for that the charge of vice-president may be held by only one person.

Presidential designates (2010–present) 
In 2008, before the Honduran primary elections, the three posts of vice-presidents were restored by order of the Supreme Court which deemed their replacement with a single vice-president unconstitutional.

References

 
Government of Honduras
Honduras